Capano is a variant of the more numerous Italian surname Capuano. It is most prevalent in the southeastern regions of Calabria and Campania and is also to be found among the American, Brazilian and Argentinian Italian diaspora. Notable people with the surname include:
 Cinzia Capano (born 1954), Italian politician
 Craig Capano (born 1985), American soccer player
 Giuseppe Perrone Capano (1898–1979), Italian politician
 Thomas Capano (1949–2011), disbarred American lawyer and former Delaware deputy attorney general

See also
Capano Creek, river in Texas

References

Italian-language surnames
Surnames of Italian origin